The 1996 Dubai World Cup was a horse race held at Nad Al Sheba Racecourse on Wednesday 27 March 1996. It was the inaugural running of the Dubai World Cup.

The winner was Allen Paulson's Cigar, a six-year-old bay horse trained in the United States by Bill Mott and ridden by Jerry Bailey.

Cigar had been the dominant racehorse in the United States in 1995, winning  eight Grade I races including the Breeders' Cup Classic and being voted American Horse of the Year. Before being shipped to Dubai he had added another Grade I success when winning the Donn Handicap in February. The 1996 Dubai World Cup also attracted competitors from the United Kingdom, Australia and Japan as well as four locally trained runners. Cigar took the lead a quarter of a mile from the finish and held off the challenge of Burt Bacharach's Soul of the Matter to win by half a length. L'Carriere, who had finished second to Cigar in the Breeders' Cup Classic, completed a 1-2-3 for American trained horses as he got the better of a struggle with the British colt Pentire for third place.

Race details
 Sponsor: none
 Purse: £2,580,645; First prize: £1,548,387
 Surface: Dirt
 Going: Fast
 Distance: 10 furlongs
 Number of runners: 11
 Winner's time: 2:03.84

Full result

 Abbreviations: DSQ = disqualified; nse = nose; nk = neck; shd = head; hd = head; nk = neck; dist = distance; BD = brought down

Winner's details
Further details of the winner, Cigar
 Sex: Stallion
 Foaled: 18 April 1990
 Country: United States
 Sire: Palace Music; Dam: Solar Slew (Seattle Slew)
 Owner: Allen Paulson
 Breeder: Allen Paulson

References

Dubai World Cup
Dubai World Cup
Dubai World Cup
Dubai World Cup